Ploiaria denticauda is a species of thread-legged bug in the family Reduviidae. It is found in North America.

References

Further reading

 

Reduviidae
Articles created by Qbugbot
Insects described in 1925